In mathematics, the Coates graph or Coates flow graph, named after C.L. Coates, is a graph associated with the  Coates' method for the solution of a system of linear equations.

The Coates graph Gc(A) associated with an n × n matrix A is an n-node, weighted, labeled, directed graph. The nodes, labeled 1 through n, are each associated with the corresponding row/column of A.  If entry aji ≠ 0 then there is a directed edge from node i to node j with weight aji. In other words, the Coates graph for matrix A is the one whose adjacency matrix is the transpose of A.

See also 
 Flow graph (mathematics)
 Mason graph

References

Application-specific graphs
Linear algebra